These are the Canadian number-one country songs of 1986, per the RPM Country Tracks chart.

See also
 1986 in music
 List of number-one country singles of 1986 (U.S.)

External links
 Read about RPM Magazine at the AV Trust
 Search RPM charts here at Library and Archives Canada

1986 in Canadian music
Canada Country
1986